Duntisbourne is part of the name of three villages in Gloucestershire, England:

Duntisbourne Abbots
Duntisbourne Leer
Duntisbourne Rouse